Roberto Manzi (born 21 March 1959) is an Italian fencer. He won a bronze medal in the team épée event at the 1984 Summer Olympics.

References

External links
 

1959 births
Living people
Italian male fencers
Olympic fencers of Italy
Fencers at the 1984 Summer Olympics
Olympic bronze medalists for Italy
Olympic medalists in fencing
Sportspeople from Rimini
Medalists at the 1984 Summer Olympics
Universiade medalists in fencing
Universiade silver medalists for Italy
Medalists at the 1985 Summer Universiade